Durgapur Institute of Legal Studies is a college providing legal education in Durgapur, West Bengal. The  college was established in 2012, and is affiliated to Kazi Nazrul University.  This college is also approved by the Bar Council of India.

Courses 
The college offers a five-years integrated B.A. LL.B. (Hons.) course, three-years LL.B. course.

See also

References

External links 
Durgapur Institute of Legal Studies
Kazi Nazrul University
University Grants Commission
National Assessment and Accreditation Council

Law schools in West Bengal
Universities and colleges in Paschim Bardhaman district
Colleges affiliated to Kazi Nazrul University
Educational institutions established in 2012
2012 establishments in West Bengal